Goutam Bhaduri (born 10 November 1962) is an Indian judge. Presently, he is a judge of the Chhattisgarh High Court.

Career

References

Indian judges
Judges of the Chhattisgarh High Court
Living people
1962 births
Delhi University alumni